Julian Sommerville Hatcher (June 26, 1888 – December 4, 1963), was a U.S. Army major general, noted firearms expert and author of the early twentieth century.  He is credited with several technical books and articles relating to military firearms, ballistics, and autoloading weapons.  His premier works are Hatcher's Notebook and Book of the Garand, along with Pistols and Revolvers and Their Uses and Textbook of Pistols and Revolvers. In the latter work he introduced the Hatcher Scale, probably the first attempt to determine the stopping power of a handgun round by a formula. He was also a pioneer in the forensic identification of firearms and their ammunition.  Hatcher retired from the United States Army as a Major General.  Afterward, he served as Technical Editor of the National Rifle Association's American Rifleman magazine.

Hatcher was born in Hayfield, Virginia and graduated with honors from Annapolis in 1909 [he voluntarily transferred from the Navy to the Army's coast artillery]. He married Eleanor Dashiell and together, they had three children. Chief of the Small Arms Division in the United States Army Ordnance Department and the Assistant Commandant of the Ordnance School before and at the beginning of World War II, he worked closely with Springfield Armory as an engineering trouble-shooter in resolving early production issues associated with the early iterations of the M1 Garand Rifle.

In 1916, the Hotchkiss M1909 Benét-Mercié machine gun was in general use with the U.S. Army and was seeing action during the Punitive Expedition against the bandit Pancho Villa. Reports of its use in Mexico indicated the gun was not functioning properly. Investigation revealed that the chief problems were the 30-round metallic feed strips used in the gun and inexperienced gunners. It was Lieutenant Hatcher who was sent to the border to solve the problems. He found that none of the soldiers had been taught the proper use of the weapon. He set up the Army's first machine gun school and was soon turning out trained crews. Soon, the Benét-Mercié proved to be an effective weapon.

Hatcher was later instrumental in developing a solution to the vexing problem of brittle metal in early M1903 receivers built by Springfield and Rock Island Arsenals. His solution to the "grenading" of receivers when shell cases failed catastrophically was to drill a gas vent hole in the left side of the receiver adjacent to the breech. This hole would allow gases escaping from a ruptured case to be exhausted safely and away from the face of the shooter. Dubbed the "Hatcher Hole", the modification was typically added to receivers at overhaul.

Hatcher died at his home in Falls Church, Virginia on December 4, 1963.

Books
Julian S. Hatcher, Glenn P. Wilhelm and Harry J. Malony, Machine Guns, Menasha, Wisc., George Banta Pub. Co., 1917 [Riling 1833]
Julian S. Hatcher, Pistols and Revolvers and Their Use, Marshallton, Del., Small-Arms Technical Pub. Co., 1927 [Riling 2017]
Julian S. Hatcher, Textbook of Pistols and Revolvers, Onslow County, N.C., Small-Arms Technical Pub. Co., 1935 [Riling 2170]
Julian S. Hatcher, Textbook of Firearms Investigation, Plantersville, S.C., Small-Arms Technical Pub. Co., 1935 [Riling 2171]
Julian S. Hatcher, Hatcher's Notebook, Harrisburg, Pa., Military Service Pub. Co., 1947 [Riling 2596]
Julian S. Hatcher, The Book of the Garand, Washington, Infantry Journal Press, 1947 [Riling 2645]
Julian S. Hatcher, Al Barr, H.P. White and Charles L. Neumann, Handloading, Washington, National Rifle Association of America, 1950. [Riling 2722]

Sources 
 Ray Riling, Guns and Shooting, a Bibliography, New York:  Greenberg, 1951.

References 

1888 births
1963 deaths
Military personnel from Virginia
Ballistics experts
American military writers
United States Army generals
United States Naval Academy alumni
United States Army Command and General Staff College alumni
United States Army War College alumni
United States Army personnel of World War I
United States Army personnel of World War II
Burials at Arlington National Cemetery
Recipients of the Distinguished Service Medal (US Army)
Recipients of the Legion of Merit
United States Distinguished Marksman